The 1991 Arizona Classic was a women's  tennis tournament played on outdoor hard courts at the Scottsdale Princess Resort in Scottsdale, Arizona in the United States and was part of Tier IV of the 1991 WTA Tour. It was the sixth, and last, edition of the tournament and was held from October 28 through November 3, 1991. Third-seeded Sabine Appelmans won the singles title and earned $27,000 first-prize money.

Finals

Singles
 Sabine Appelmans defeated  Chanda Rubin 7–5, 6–1
 It was Appelmans' 1st singles of her career.

Doubles
 Peanut Louie Harper /  Cammy MacGregor defeated  Sandy Collins /  Elna Reinach 7–5, 3–6, 6–3

References

External links
 ITF tournament edition details
 Tournament draws

Virginia Slims of Arizona
Virginia Slims of Arizona
Arizona Classic
Arizona Classic
Arizona Classic